Theri ( Spark) is a 2016 Indian Tamil-language action thriller film written and directed by Atlee Kumar and produced by Kalaipuli S. Thanu under the banner V Creations. It is inspired from Mani Ratnam's film Chatriyan. The film stars Vijay, Samantha Ruth Prabhu and Amy Jackson. The film's music is composed by G. V. Prakash Kumar, with cinematography handled by George C. Williams and editing done by Ruben. In the film, a former police officer is on a mission to protect his daughter from his past enemies.

The film marked Kumar's second directorial after Raja Rani (2013), whose success impressed Vijay to work with the director. Atlee came up with the script, which was an "emotional action thriller film" and a formal announcement was made during September 2014. After post-production works and a formal launch ceremony in June 2015, the film began production in Chennai during early July. The film was halted twice due to the Film Employees Federation of South India's strike and the heavy flooding in Chennai. In addition, poor climatic conditions in China meant that the team had to abandon their idea of filming sequences there and instead opted to shoot in Bangkok. Despite the difficulties, the film was completed within January 2016.

Theri was released on 14 April 2016 and received positive reviews from critics and audience. It further won three SIIMA Awards, three IIFA Utsavam awards, two Ananda Vikatan Cinema Awards and nine nominations at the 64th Filmfare Awards South. The film was adapted into Assamese as Ratnakar (2019). It is currently considered as one among the most-popular films in Vijay's career, due to the commercial elements in the film and its multiple re-runs in television channels had attributed to more popularity.

Plot 

Joseph Kuruvilla is a non-violent person, who runs a bakery and lives with his five-year old daughter Niveditha "Nivi" and they lead a peaceful life. Joseph soon befriends Nivi's teacher Annie, who starts developing a crush on him. However, Annie learns that Joseph is actually DCP Vijay Kumar, an honest cop in Chennai. When confronted with the truth, Joseph reveals his past.

Past: One night, Vijay meets an old man who comes up with a complaint to find his missing daughter Raji, an IT worker, where he investigates the case and within ten hours, only to find that she was raped to death. Vijay's further investigation led him to Ashwin, who is the son of Labour minister Vanamaamalai. After three days of Raji's death, Vijay heads to Vanamaamalai's house to arrest Ashwin, but Vanamaamalai and commissioner Sibi Chakravarthy informs him that Ashwin was missing since three days and Vijay was tasked of finding Ashwin. 

Vanamaamalai learns that Ashwin was murdered by Vijay himself, where he swears to seek vengeance on him for killing his son. Vijay then meets Mithra, a doctor and asks to marry him, where she accepts after both of them fall in love. They both then have Nivi. Unfortunately, on the night of Deepavali, Vanamaamalai and his brother Ratnam, along with their henchmen barged into Vijay's house, where they killed Vijay's mother and his wife Mithra, and also attempted to drown Vijay's infant daughter Nivi. However, an injured Mithra saves Nivi and makes Vijay to take a vow that he will raise their daughter Nivi as a non-violent person and would quit the police force. Vijay accepts Mithra's vow and fakes his death in order to protect Nivi, before the explosion.

Present: Vijay tells Annie to keep it as a secret from Nivi. During Nivi's excursion, Vanamaamalai knows he is alive, then Joseph sees the school bus swerve, because the brakes of her school bus is damaged and the bus falls from the bridge into a river. With the help of Annie and the local people, Vijay manages to rescue Nivi and other children, where he learns that Vanamaamalai (who has now learnt that Vijay is alive) is behind the accident and returns to his old self to seek vengeance against Vanamaamalai. 

Vijay returns to Chennai and kills Inspector Karikalan, who is Vanamaamalai's henchmen and was also present at the night when Mithra was killed. At this point of time,  Vanamaamalai and Ratnam have a fallout, where Vijay also kills him at night, by pushing him from the thirtieth floor of a building. Finally, Vijay gets captured by Vanamaamalai's henchmen, only for them to realize that it was Vijay's plan to get captured. He later kills Vanamaamalai's henchmen and Vanamaamalai. The killings continue to be a mystery from the public, but Sibi Chakravarthy is aware that Vijay is alive and secretly re-employs him into the police force. 

A few years later, Vijay, an older Nivi and Annie are in Ladakh. Vijay, who has changed his identity to Dharmeshwar, continues to work for the CBI and also fulfilling Mithra's wishes.

Cast 

Cameo appearance 
 Sunaina as Vijay's prospective bride

Production

Development 
In January 2014, Vijay expressed his interest to work with a project directed by Atlee, after being impressed by his debut directorial film Raja Rani (2013); the latter also expected to work in the film, since he had been a fan of the actor, and also admired his recent projects. Kalaipuli S. Thanu was reported to finance the project and was officially announced in September 2014. The producers further announced that the team may start filming, only after the completion of Vijay's other film Puli (2015), while Atlee continued to script the film through late-2014. In November 2014, G. V. Prakash Kumar was announced as the music composer collaborating with Vijay and Atlee, after Thalaivaa and Raja Rani. Several of the technical crew involved in Atlee's previous film, Raja Rani, were also added to the team including cinematographer George C. Williams, editor Ruben and art director T. Muthuraj. The film is touted to be an emotional-action thriller where Vijay would essay the role of a police officer and a father in the film, and was reported to be inspired from Chatriyan (1990). Several titles for the film including Moondru Mugam, Vetri, Thuppaki 2, Khakee and Thaarumaaru were considered, before the makers finalised Theri in late November 2015. The first look of the film was also released on that date.

Casting 

Soon after the announcement, many reports been surfaced that Nayanthara will play the female lead. However, in January 2015, the actress refuted her claims of being part in the film. Later, Samantha Ruth Prabhu was announced as the female lead. Amy Jackson also joined the film as the second female lead; she was reportedly essayed the role of a Malayalam-speaking school teacher in the film. Initially, the team approached few Hindi actresses for Jackson's role, whom had turned down the offer. In March 2015, veteran actress and film producer Raadhika Sarathkumar was essayed the role of Vijay's mother in the film, collaborating with Vijay for the second time after 27 years. Bharathiraja was approached by the team, for playing the antagonist role in the film, but his refusal on being a part of the film, led Atlee choose veteran director Mahendran as the antagonist. Similarly, Sathyaraj too approached for another pivotal role, which he denied due to his priorities in Baahubali 2: The Conclusion, led Prabhu to play the role. During the start of the project, actress Meena's daughter Nainika officially confirmed to be a part of the film, thereby making her acting debut. She would play Vijay's reel-life daughter in the film. Sunainaa was also roped in to play an extended cameo in the film. Actress Amritha Aiyer, appeared in an uncredited role playing Samantha's cousin.

Filming 
An official launch event was held at the Kerala Club House on the East Coast Road in Chennai, with several members of the cast and crew in attendance on 26 June 2015. The film began production in Chennai during early-July 2015 and an introductory song for Vijay was shot in the city, followed by scenes featuring Vijay and Samantha on the East Coast Road. Further scenes in Chennai were shot at Adityaram Studios and at Binny Mills, where art director T. Muthuraj had erected a huge set. Raadhika was also a part of the shoot, while actress Sunaina shot for one day in the schedule which ended in mid-July. The second schedule was reported to begin during the end of the month, was briefly delayed owing to a strike held by the Tamil Film Producers Council against Film Employees Federation of South India.

The second schedule for the film restarted in Chennai on 3 August 2015, with Vijay and Samantha joining the shoot and went for 25 days. Few sequences were also shot at MGM Dizzee World on the East Coast Road. A further schedule began again for a month long shoot in September 2015 in Chennai. In mid-September, the team shot few sequences at veteran actor Sivaji Ganesan's ancestral house Annai Illam and the shoot went for 2–3 days. In November 2015, it was revealed that the film was "seventy percent complete" and portions involving Samantha Prabhu had finished being shot. Thereafter, Amy Jackson subsequently joined the team in Chennai to shoot for her part during a new schedule. Action scenes, choreographed by Dhilip Subbarayan were filmed throughout the month, with the shoot disrupted by the heavy flooding in Chennai.

Hollywood stunt choreographer Kaloyan Vodenicharov worked with the team in early December 2015 to help shoot the climax portions for the film. Poor climatic conditions in China meant that the team had to abandon their idea of filming sequences there and instead opted to shoot in Bangkok. Sets were erected in a factory in Chennai to shoot the climax scenes, with Kaloyan recruited to help train artistes and film the sequences during December 2015. In mid-January 2016, an under water stunt sequence was filmed under the guidance of Subbrarayan. The team started filming a song featuring Vijay and Jackson, and with the completion of the song, the principal photography was wrapped.

Music 

The film's soundtrack and score is composed by G. V. Prakash Kumar. In addition to being his second collaboration with Vijay and Atlee, the film also marked Prakash's 50th project as a composer. Soon after his inclusion in the project, Prakash started composing the songs during November 2014 and completed work within January 2016. In his micro-blogging page, the composer said that all the tracks in the film are "trend-setting", and featured songs recorded by veteran composer Deva, actor-director T. Rajendar, Uthara Unnikrishnan and the actor Vijay himself. The album featured seven tracks, with lyrics written by Pulamaipithan, Na. Muthukumar, Pa. Vijay, Kabilan, Rokesh, R. Thiyagarajan and Arunraja Kamaraj. It was released on 20 March 2016 by Think Music. The release coincided with a promotional event held at Sathyam Cinemas in Chennai, with the presence of the cast and crew. Irrespective of the full songs, a bonus track titled "Hey Aasmaan" was released on 10 April 2016.

Marketing 
Promotional stills from the film released on 15 January 2016, coinciding with Pongal. The official teaser was unveiled on 5 February 2016. The teaser which was initially uploaded on the midnight of 5 February, was removed after copyright claims from an anonymous channel, but was later restored by the technical team. The teaser received praise from fans and celebrities, and garnered 1.5 million views within 24 hours of its release.

The promotions of the film began during 14 March 2016, with the team releasing special posters ahead of the audio launch on 20 March. A month before its release, SPI Cinemas,  which acquired the distribution rights of the film, started pre-bookings of the film in theatres, months before its release. The pre-booking facilities were affiliated to theatres owned by SPI Cinemas – which include Sathyam, Escape and S2 Theatres. It has reported that, the active campaigning by the fans of Vijay through social media, with the extensive promotions had attributed to the hype, with Abirami Ramanathan, managing director of Abirami Multiplex, said that more than 6,000 tickets have been sold for the first five days of its release.

Release

Theatrical 
Theri was earlier scheduled to be released on 14th April 2016, receiving U/A certificate. However after many cuts from the Central Board of Film Certification to reduce the scenes of severe violence and gore, the film received a 'U' certificate. Earlier in July 2015, the team had fixed two release dates tentatively – one being scheduled on the occasion of Pongal (15 January 2016) and the other being fixed for the Republic Day weekend (22 January 2016). The team had planned the release date depending on the film's early completion. However, the production delays had forced the team to push the release date to Tamil New Year (14 April 2016). Intentionally, Rajinikanth-starrer Kabali, Thanu's another film he had produced, also scheduled for the release on the same day, and as no two Tamil films, produced by the same company or producer will clash on the same date, the team planned to postpone the release further to 1 May 2016. Eventually, in December 2015, Thanu announced for an interchange of release dates between the two films, with Theri being scheduled to release on 14 April.

Screening and statics 
The film opened in more than 1000 screens worldwide, with 350 screens in Tamil Nadu, 200 screens in Kerala, 150 screens in Andhra Pradesh and Telangana, and 70 screens in Karnataka. In addition, the film was screened in 400 theatres across overseas centers, with 144 screens across United States. CineGalaxy Inc, which had distributed the film in United States, stated that it is the "biggest release for a Vijay-film in recent years".

Distribution 
The Tamil Nadu theatrical rights of the film were sold to ₹49.40 crore, with SPI Cinemas acquiring the Chennai city distribution rights to ₹4.5 crore, and also selling the theatrical rights in the Chengalpet region, with Impossible Films buying them for ₹9.5 crore. Coimbatore rights have been sold to ₹8.5 crore. The distribution rights for Madurai have been sold to Impala Theatres for ₹6.9 crore, followed by the Trichy-Thanjavur region, where Green Screen Narayanaswamy acquired the theatrical rights to a sum of ₹5.6 crore. 7G Films has bagged the rights of the Salem region for ₹4.6 crore. Dr Albert has acquired the South Arcot rights for ₹3.40 crore, and Devraj of Alankar Theatres purchased the North Arcot rights for ₹3.15 crore. Mannan Films has acquired the Tirunelveli & Kanyakumari rights for ₹3.25 crore.

Karnataka theatrical rights were purchased by Goldie Films, with Kerala rights were purchased by Friday Film House and Carnival Motion Pictures at ₹5.6 crore, highest for a non-Malayalam film. Dil Raju's Sri Venkateswara Creations procured the theatrical rights in the Andhra and Telangana regions. CineGalaxy Inc, a Texas-based distribution company acquired the theatrical rights in the United States for ₹3 crore. The respective overseas distributors are: Ayngaran International (Europe and Sri Lanka), AP International (Singapore and UAE), Malik Stream Corporation (Malaysia), Celluloid Studios (Japan) and MKS Retails (Australia and New Zealand).

Legal issues 
The film was not screened in many theatres across Chengalpet, owing to the issues between the producers and distributors over profit-sharing. Eventually, the distributors were reluctant to buy the film under Minimum-guarantee (MG) basis, due to the losses of big-budget Tamil films in the recent years, with Lingaa (2014) in particular, where the film had incurred huge losses to the film's distributors. Panneer Selvam, the sectretary of Tamil Nadu Theatre Owners Association (TNTOA) blamed Thanu saying that "he had asked unreasonable MG rates for the film, especially in a risky situation, where if that film fails, it may incur huge losses to the producers and distributors".

Another sources claimed that there held a raid in Chengalpet theatres, following complaints of overpricing of ticket rates. It has been stated that the film's release had coincided with the period of Tamil Nadu Legislative Assembly election, where the moral code of conduct was in force and huge complaints from audiences, a huge crackdown was imitated by the authorities against the theatre owners selling tickets above the government-stipulated rates. Many of them feared selling tickets at higher rates as it may lead to suspension of the theatre licence. As a result, the theatre owners were reluctant to pay high MG rates as it cannot be recovered on normal ticket rates.

The issue became serious as Thanu had announced that Rajinikanth's Kabali, which he had produced, will not be screened in the said theatres across Chengalpet, which refused to screen the film. Producer K. E. Gnanavel Raja also supported Thanu's decision, and said that the films he had distributed – Suriya's 24 and Singam 3 – will face boycott in the Chengalpet region, if the issue had not cleared. Thanu also blamed the "theatre mafia" saying that "the middlemen and brokers is trying to take over the business with this issue". On 29 April 2016, the film was screened in Chengalpet, two weeks after the original release, as the talks with the producers and stakeholders became fruitful, leading to resolve the issue.

Piracy 
On 15 April 2016, a group of actor Vijay's fans caught a videographer for recording the film at a theatre in Coimbatore for piracy purposes. It was revealed that he along with two of other members, were working at a Tamil-language television channel, Polimer TV and the pirated footage of one-and-a-half hour was handed by the videographer to the television staff. Reacting to the issue, the Tamil Film Producers Council and the sister associations of Tamil film fraternity sued the channel for the illegitimate piracy. However, the channel refuted and claimed that they had never indulged in video piracy. A bus driver, named Shankar was booked by the police, for buying pirated versions of the film (along with Suriya's 24) stored in DVDs and screened at a private luxury bus. Apparently Shankar stated that the bus owner had nothing to do with the pirated DVDs.

Home media 
The satellite rights of this film, along with Thanu's other production Kabali, were remained unsold. In March 2016, it has been reported that Star Vijay and Jaya TV were considered for acquiring the television rights of the film, which did not happen. In November 2016, following its launch in India, Amazon Prime Video had acquired the digital rights of the two films and streamed them exclusively through the platform. After multiple deliberations, Sun TV acquired the television rights in September 2017, and premiered the film exclusively on 18 October 2017, coinciding with Diwali.

Reception

Box office 
In the opening day of its release, the film had collected ₹18.1 crore at the domestic box office and ₹39.96 crore worldwide. According to Behindwoods, the film took a "gargantuan opening" ₹3.07 crore within the first four days at the Chennai city box office. At the second day, the film had collected ₹7.12 crore in Tamil Nadu, with a 50% drop compared to the first day collections. The film grossed  worldwide in first weekend; By the end of its first 6 days in theaters, the film had grossed  worldwide, becoming Vijay's third film to do so, following Thuppakki (2012), Kaththi (2014) and Puli (2015).

At-the end of June 2016, the film crossed  at the box-office, becoming Vijay's first film in his career to enter the 150-crore club. At the Chennai city, Theri was the highest grossing Tamil film with a revenue of ₹11.5 crore, which was later broken by Master (2021), another Vijay-starrer film that had earned ₹11.56 crore.

In the United Kingdom, the film broke Enthiran'''s box office collection for the first weekend, by collecting , while Enthiran had collected . As of May 2016, the film had collected ₹44.37 crore from overseas centres; the film collected $728,317 in United States, $399,079 in Canada,  MYR 5,644,489 in Malaysia, where it contributed the major collections.

 Critical response 

M. Suganth of The Times of India rated 3 stars (out of 5) and said that "With the right material, Vijay can elevate even an ordinary scene with his amazing screen presence and he can effortlessly play to the gallery. This is a formulaic film and can be best described only with another cliche — Old wine in a fancy extra-large bottle". Gautaman Bhaskaran of Hindustan Times rated the film 2.5 stars (out of 5) saying, "Theri has all the essentials one expects in a Vijay starrer, but central to the film is the father-daughter relationship and that’s where the film scores big". Bardwaj Rangan of The Hindu stated that Atlee's screenplay checks all boxes and we're checking these boxes 10 minutes ahead of him. But we let all of this pass because what we look for are the mass moments, the moments that creep past the logic centres in the brain and affect us almost atavistically." Kirubhakar Purushothaman of India Today rated 3 (out of 5) saying "Theri is a film you go to with battalions of friends or family on a weekend, and come back without giving it a second thought".Sify also rated the film 3 out of 5 stars saying that "Vijay's scorching screen presence and his infectious energy is the highlight." Behindwoods also rated the film 2.75 stars out of 5, stating that "Theri is a little predictable emotional ride with some great performances, superlative technical work with a mix of commercial elements." Anupama Subramanian of Deccan Chronicle rated two-and-a-half out of five stars saying "The film highly relies on Vijay's strength and charisma to carry it through, thus living up to the expectations and the huge pre hype created to some extent." Latha Srinivasan of Daily News and Analysis gave 2.5 (out of 5) saying "Vijay fans will find the movie delightful, others may not". Writing for The Indian Express, Goutham VS gave two stars out of five and said that "The movie, possibly the millionth remake of Rajnikanth’s revenge film Baashha, where the hero is a daredevil with a larger-than-life persona, is yawn-inducing". Ananda Vikatan rated the film 43 out of 100. Indiaglitz rated the film 3 out of 5 and called it as "an entertaining revenge drama from Atlee and Vijay".

 Accolades 

 Impact Theri has been considered as one of the popular films of Vijay in the recent times. It also led to the repeated collaborations between Atlee and Vijay, where they went to work on Mersal (2017) and Bigil (2019). However, Atlee still stated it as "one of his favourite films in his career". On 14 April 2021, during the film's fifth anniversary, Atlee tweeted a thread of stills from the films, praising the actor, actress, crew and producer for the film, while also referring it as "close to his heart". The film emerged popularity over multiple re-runs on television channels and had garnered record impressions; apart from the original, the Hindi-dubbed version of the film gained popularity in televisions and the Bengali-dubbed version has received a great response on the Bongo OTT platform. It was re-released in Tamil Nadu theatres on 21 June 2019, ahead of the actor's 45th birthday. Indian cricketer Ravindra Jadeja, stated Theri as his favourite film at an interview to his fans. During the COVID-19 lockdown in India, a group of Tamil Nadu Police members performed a parody version of the song "Jithu Jilladi" to create awareness to control the pandemic.

 Remake 
In June 2016, a Hindi remake of the film was planned by Rohit Shetty, with Shah Rukh Khan and Akshay Kumar as the frontrunners to play the leads. However, Shetty denied the plans of remaking the film. Later, in April 2020, Varun Dhawan was rumoured to play the lead in the adaptation.The film was partially remade into Assamese as Ratnakar'' (2019) by Jatin Bora.

Notes

References

External links 
 
 

2016 films
2016 action films
2010s Tamil-language films
Indian action films
Films scored by G. V. Prakash Kumar
Films shot in Ladakh
Films shot in Jammu and Kashmir
Films shot in Bangkok
Films set in Kerala
Films shot in Kerala
Films set in Chennai
Films shot in Chennai
Films shot in Goa
2016 masala films
Films about rape
Fictional portrayals of the Tamil Nadu Police
2010s police procedural films
Films about rape in India
Indian police films
Films directed by Atlee (director)
Films set in Jharkhand
Films set in Jamshedpur